Pristimantis factiosus is a species of frog in the family Strabomantidae. It is endemic to the eastern slopes of the Cordillera Central in Colombia and only known from near its type locality, El Estadero in Samaná, Caldas Department, and from Anorí, Antioquia Department. The IUCN SSC Amphibian Specialist Group, however, has mapped its distribution as continuous between these locations. The specific name factiosus refers to sexual dimorphism in coloration of the flanks.

Description
Adult males measure  and adult females  in snout–vent length. The snout is subacuminate in dorsal view and rounded in lateral profile. The tympanum rounded and prominent. The fingers bear narrow lateral keels and round terminal discs. The toes bear lateral keels and round terminal discs that are smaller than those of fingers. No webbing is present. Skin is very finely shagreened. There are ill-defined, partial dorsolateral folds at mid-body. The dorsum is pale yellowish-brown to dark brown. There is a black inter-orbital bar and spots forming a dorsal chevron; the sides of the head are also black. The venter is dirty white or gray with black stippling. Males have a large pale area edged in brown on posterior flank/groin, while the corresponding pale area in females is diffuse, without well-defined edges. The iris is dark red.

Habitat and conservation
It is nocturnal and can be found on low vegetation. Development is direct (i.e, there is no free-living larval stage). It is preyed upon by the carnivorous frog Hemiphractus johnsoni.

An adaptable and common species, Pristimantis factiosus  is not facing known threats and is not considered threatened.

References

factiosus
Amphibians of the Andes
Amphibians of Colombia
Endemic fauna of Colombia
Amphibians described in 1998
Taxa named by John Douglas Lynch
Taxonomy articles created by Polbot